Technetium(IV) bromide is an inorganic compound with the formula TcBr4. A brown solid, it is moderately soluble in water.

Preparation
Technetium tetrabromide is produced by combining the elements at elevated temperatures:
Tc + 2Br2 → TcBr4

Structure
As verified by X-ray crystallography, the compound is an inorganic polymer consisting of interconnected TcBr6 octahedra. Platinum(IV) bromide and osmium(IV) bromide adopt similar structures.

References

Technetium compounds